Shu-Enlil (also known as Ibarum) was a son of Sargon the Great, first ruler of the Akkadian Empire. He lived in the 23rd century BCE.

See also
Ibrium
Ibrahim (disambiguation)

References
 Frayne, Douglas R. "Sargonic and Gutian Period." The Royal Inscriptions of Mesopotamia, Vol. 2. Univ. of Toronto Press, 1993.

Akkadian people
23rd-century BC deaths
Year of birth unknown
23rd-century BC people